Mouhamed "Sena" Niang (born 8 October 1999) is a Senegalese professional footballer who plays as a midfielder for League Two club Hartlepool United.

Playing career

Pollok
Niang began his playing career with Pollok in August 2017. He made his competitive debut for the club in a 1–0 win against Arthurlie in the Sectional League Cup. Niang made a total of 19 league appearances for Pollok.

Partick Thistle
After impressing with Pollok, Niang joined Partick Thistle on trial playing for their reserves. However, his signing process was delayed due to work permit issues. Sena officially signed for the club on 18 September 2018. In January 2019, he signed an extended contract with Thistle and immediately moved out on loan to Cumnock Juniors for the remainder of the 2019–20 season to gain first-team experience.

On 30 September 2019, Niang joined Scottish League One side Montrose on loan until January. He made 15 appearances in all competitions for Montrose, scoring once.

After making his debut for Thistle in the Scottish Challenge Cup in 2019, Niang made his league debut for the club on 17 October 2020 coming on as a substitute for Salim Kouider-Aïssa in a 1-0 defeat to Clyde. In November 2020, he won Partick's Player of the Month award.
After establishing himself in the Thistle first team during 2020, Niang signed a three-year contract extension with Thistle on the 17th of December 2020.
He made 17 league appearances in the 2020–21 season as Thistle won Scottish League One and achieved promotion to the Scottish Championship. 

In August 2021, Niang moved on loan to Scottish League One side Alloa Athletic for the entirety of the 2021–22 season. He played 34 times for the club in all competitions, scoring four times.

Hartlepool United
On 23 June 2022, it was announced that Sena had joined League Two side Hartlepool United.

Style of play
Sena is predominately a defensive midfielder but he is also capable of playing in central midfield, as well as in the centre of defence where he played numerous times for Partick. He is a tough tackler and in October 2021, he picked up one of the fastest red cards in Scottish football history when he was sent off for a lunge after 25 seconds for Alloa against Cove Rangers. In January 2022, Sena picked up a two match ban due to crunching tackle on Celtic midfielder Yosuke Ideguchi.

Personal life
Nicknamed "Sena", Niang was born in Dakar in Senegal but his family moved to Manchester in 2004. In 2008, his family moved back to Senegal for two years before moving to Glasgow. He is a fan of Manchester United but described Senegal-born Patrick Vieira as his footballing hero. Niang attended All Saints Roman Catholic Secondary School and played for their school team.

Career statistics

Honours
Partick Thistle
Scottish League One: 2020–21

References

External links

Player profile at Hartlepool United
Player profile at Pollok

1999 births
Living people
People educated at All Saints Roman Catholic Secondary School
Senegalese footballers
Senegalese expatriate footballers
Senegalese expatriate sportspeople in England
Association football midfielders
Pollok F.C. players
Partick Thistle F.C. players
Cumnock Juniors F.C. players
Montrose F.C. players
Alloa Athletic F.C. players
Hartlepool United F.C. players
Scottish Professional Football League players
West of Scotland Football League
English Football League players